Stensätra IF is a Swedish football club located in Sandviken.

Background
Stensätra IF currently plays in Division 4 Gestrikland which is the sixth tier of Swedish football. They play their home matches at the Skogsvallen in Sandviken.

The club is affiliated to Gestriklands Fotbollförbund. Stensätra IF have competed in the Svenska Cupen on 9 occasions and have played 13 matches in the competition.

Season to season

Footnotes

External links 
 Stensätra IF - Official website
 Stensätra IF on Facebook

Football clubs in Gävleborg County
Association football clubs established in 1943
1943 establishments in Sweden